Alan Carr's Epic Gameshow is a British game show which premiered 30 May 2020 on ITV. Hosted by Alan Carr, the series features reworked and "supersized" versions of past ITV game shows (primarily from the Fremantle library), with each featuring a new "epic endgame". In February 2023, it was reported that ITV had shelved the series.

Series overview

Episodes

Series 1 (2020)

Series 2 (2021–22)

Series 3 (2022)

See also 
 Ant and Dec's/Vernon Kay's Gameshow Marathon, a similar series aired to mark ITV's 50th anniversary.

Notes

References

External links 

2020s British game shows
2020 British television series debuts
2022 British television series endings
English-language television shows
ITV game shows
Television series by Fremantle (company)